Kelly Junge Jr. is a former child actor.

Career
He is best remembered for his role as Timmy Martin's friend, Scott Richards, in the long- running television series, Lassie. Junge appeared in thirteen episodes during the troubled last half of the fourth season (1957–1958). The character was created to give Timmy a companion his own age, but "Scott" was canceled at the end of the season.

References

External links
 

Year of birth missing (living people)
American male child actors
20th-century American male actors
Living people